Litvínov is a town in Most District in the Ústí nad Labem Region of the Czech Republic. It has about 22,000 inhabitants. It is known as an industrial centre.

Administrative parts
Litvínov is made up of 12 town parts and villages:

Dolní Litvínov
Horní Litvínov
Chudeřín
Hamr
Horní Ves
Janov
Křížatky
Lounice
Písečná
Růžodol
Šumná
Záluží

History

The first written mention is from 1352 under the name Lutwinow. The word is made up of two Old High German words, liut – "people" and wini – „friend“. Originally the town consisted of two settlements – Horní Litvínov and Dolní Litvínov with forts.

In 1715, count Jan Josef Valdštejn founded a large cloth factory, one of the first in the Czech lands.

Litvínov was promoted to a town on 5 October 1852. In the 19th century, the industrialization of Litvínov deepened. Many new factories were established. Toys and wooden goods were made here, cotton was processed. The mining of lignite, which persists to this day, began, and after a new part of the railway was put into operation in 1870, other coal mines were opened. In a short time, a total of 19 mines were built. Employment opportunities attracted many new residents.

As a result of the global economic crisis in the 1930s, the largely industrial Litvínov was also severely affected. Production was limited in factories or was completely stopped, and the mines were also affected.

In 1939, a large oil refinery was founded south of the town.

Demographics

Economy
The largest oil refinery in the Czech Republic (Orlen Unipetrol) is located there.

Transport
In addition to buses, trams also provide public transport. The town operates a transport company together with the neighbouring city of Most.

Sport
Lítvínov is a traditional centre of ice hockey. Local club HC Litvínov is a stable part of the top national league (Extraliga) for more than 50 years. Many famous ice hockey players and coaches are connected with HC Litvínov, including Olympic gold medalists Ivan Hlinka, Vladimír Růžička, Jiří Šlégr, Robert Reichel and Martin Ručinský.

Sights

Church of Saint Michael is the oldest and most important state-protected monument of Litvínov. It was built in 1685–1694 in the early-Baroque style. The church has been renovated many times, for the first time in 1763. During the major renovation, which took place between 1887 and 1902, the interior was significantly beautified.

Waldstein's Castle (also called Litvínov Castle) serves today social and cultural purposes. It was rebuilt into the form of today's Baroque chateau between 1732 and 1743 by the architect František Maxmilián Kaňka. After the abolition of the castle garden, an English-style castle park with an area of 8 ha was established in 1878. From the end of the 19th century, the castle was used for economic purposes, and since 1964 a museum has been established here.

Osada, local part of Horní Litvínov, is well preserved and is protected by law as an urban monument zone. It includes a uniform and high-quality urban area with apartment buildings built by the occupation authorities during the World War II for employees of the chemical factory in Záluží.

Notable people
Květoslav Minařík (1908–1974), yogi and mystic 
Milan Šťovíček (born 1958), politician and mayor of Litvínov in 2006–2009 and 2010–2014
Josef Beránek (born 1969), ice hockey player and coach
Robert Reichel (born 1971), ice hockey player
Eva Herzigová (born 1973), model
Iva Frühlingová (born 1982), singer and model
Zuzana Tvarůžková (born 1983), TV presenter
Jakub Petružálek (born 1985), ice hockey player

Twin towns – sister cities

Litvínov is twinned with:
 Brie-Comte-Robert, France
 Olbernhau, Germany

References

External links

Brief history of Litvínov (in Czech)

Cities and towns in the Czech Republic
Populated places in Most District